John "JD" DeServio is an American musician who has been the bassist of heavy metal band Black Label Society since 2005.
He was also a member of Pride & Glory, a southern rock trio, for a short time in December 1994 (again as a replacement for Lomenzo), and was Black Label Society's original bassist, playing on the tour supporting their debut album, Sonic Brew. DeServio also performed on Michael Romeo's solo albums War of the Worlds, Pt. 1 (2018) and War of the Worlds, Pt. 2 (2022).

DeServio has his own band called Cycle of Pain whose debut album was released in April 2009 via Reform Records. He endorses Schecter bass guitars and DR strings.

DeServio has been a resident of Keyport, New Jersey.

References

External links 
 
 Interview with JD DeServio..., 6/01/2009

Year of birth missing (living people)
Living people
Guitarists from New Jersey
American heavy metal bass guitarists
People from Keyport, New Jersey
American male bass guitarists
Pride and Glory (band) members
Black Label Society members
American people of Italian descent
20th-century American bass guitarists
21st-century American bass guitarists
20th-century American male musicians
21st-century American male musicians

it:Black Label Society#Formazione